Cabanis is the surname of:
George Cabanis (1815-1892), American politician
Jean Cabanis (1816–1906), German ornithologist
José Cabanis (1922–2000), French writer, historian and magistrate
Pierre Jean George Cabanis (1757-1808), French physiologist and philosopher

See also
Cabaniss, surname